Guessiguié is a town in south-eastern Ivory Coast. It is a sub-prefecture of Agboville Department in Agnéby-Tiassa Region, Lagunes District. The town is divided into two halves, Guessiguié I and Guessiguié II. The town is 15 kilometres north of the border of Abidjan Autonomous District.

Guessiguié was a commune until March 2012, when it became one of 1126 communes nationwide that were abolished.

In 2014, the population of the sub-prefecture of Guessiguié was 21,911.

Villages
The 12 villages of the sub-prefecture of Guessiguié and their population in 2014 are:

References

Sub-prefectures of Agnéby-Tiassa
Former communes of Ivory Coast